Jonathan Magri Overend (born 6 June 1970) is a former Maltese international footballer. During his career he played for Sliema Wanderers(139), ŻurrieqFC (12), BirkirkaraFC(158) and Hamrun Spartans FC (99), where he played as a central defender and midfielder. He represented Malta 5 times, scoring 1 goal. Retiring at 38, he switched to the national Futsal league, playing for 5 seasons, being finalist and runner up in 3 successive seasons. During this time he made 5 Futsal national team appearances, scoring 1 goal.

References
 

Living people
1970 births
Maltese footballers
Sliema Wanderers F.C. players
Żurrieq F.C. players
Birkirkara F.C. players
Ħamrun Spartans F.C. players
Association football midfielders
Malta international footballers